The End is a live album by Crack the Sky. It was released on LP in 1984 by the Criminal Records label (catalog #CR-1711).

Track listing
All songs written by John Palumbo
"Monkey Time" – 3:45
"Skin Deep" – 4:15
"Ice" – 10:46
"Astro Boy" – 5:41
"All American Boy" – 3:20
"Nuclear Apathy" – 4:54
"Hot Razors" – 5:25

Personnel

The band
John Palumbo – Lead vocals, guitar
Vince DePaul – Synthesizer, piano
Bobby Hird – Lead guitar
John Tracey – Drums
Carey Zeigler – Bass guitar

Additional musicians
The Tones – Back-up vocals ("Monkey Time", "Skin Deep")

Production
John J. Ariosa, Jr. — Executive producer
Victor Giordano – Producer, mixing
Walter Copeland – Mastering
James Oberg – Additional engineering

Additional credits
Richard (Vance) Van Horne – Project coordination
John Palumbo – Jacket concept
Albert Cozzie – Jacket graphics
Recorded live by Sheffield Audio/Video Remote Truck
Recorded and mixed at Sheffield Audio/Video Productions, Studio A
Special thanks Nancy Scaggs, Casey Dansicker, Ed Feldman, Rockin' Jack D, Everyone at the Hill, Kay Nobile, Mary Palumbo
"The concept of Crack the Sky belongs to a string of moments, more than to any grouping of individuals. Such a moment is presented here in this collection of titles performed live. It's been fun and misery, but above all, I think we managed to grab an ear or two and for that we are grateful" — John Palumbo

Sources
LP liner notes

Crack the Sky live albums
1984 live albums